Oil painting reproductions are paintings that have been created by copying in oils an original oil painting by an artist.

Oil painting reproductions are distinct from original oil painting such as are often of interest to collectors and museums. Oil painting reproduction can, however, sometimes be regarded as artworks in themselves.

Oil painting reproductions can be labeled with several different categories.

 Studio of: created in the studio of a master artist, perhaps with their supervision or participation.
 Circle of: a work created by someone associated with the original artist, during or in the years immediately following the artist’s own lifetime.
 After: an exact or partial imitation of a known work by a famous artist.
 Style of: an interpretation of the artist’s style done by someone else at a later date.

History

The traces of oil painting reproduction are found since 16th century.  Traditionally, students of the old masters learned how to paint by working in the style of their teachers.

This process of mimicking their master’s work would enable a student to practice a skilled mode of painting before developing their own approach. Many famous artists employed this practice, such as John Singer Sargent, Edgar Degas, and Pablo Picasso.

Perhaps the most well known of all students who learned by reproduction was Leonardo da Vinci. Beginning as an apprentice under the master sculptor and painter Andrea Del Verrocchio, Leonardo would have learned to paint in the style of the master himself. It is said that after Leonardo brilliantly aided Verrocchio in the painting of The Baptism of Christ, the master resolved to never touch a brush again

Forms

Oil on canvas
Oil on panel
Oil on copper

Copyright issues

There are several issues related to art forgery and copyright violation that applies to the reproduction of oil paintings. The copyright laws varies from country to country but in the U.S. however there is no copyright infringement that applies to a painting 70 years after the death of its artist.

References 

Painting
Copying